Donald Kevin Max (22 May 1957 – 23 June 2015) was a Tanzanian CCM politician and Member of Parliament for Geita constituency from 2010 to his death in 2015.

References

1957 births
2015 deaths
Chama Cha Mapinduzi MPs
Tanzanian MPs 2010–2015
Azania Secondary School alumni
Tanzanian expatriates in Russia